Orlando Homer Méndez-Valdez (born April 29, 1986) is an American-born Mexican professional basketball player for the Capitanes de Ciudad de México of the NBA G League. He played college basketball for the Western Kentucky Hilltoppers.

High school career
Mendez-Valdez attended Lanier High School in San Antonio, Texas, where he graduated in 2004.  He was named the San Antonio Player of the year his senior year and first team All State honors, and his jersey number was retired in 2009.

Mendez-Valdez attended prep school at Charis Prep in Goldsboro, North Carolina. He won the MVP award in the Bull City Classic, and led the team to a championship at the tournament.

College career
At the collegiate level, Mendez-Valdez played for Western Kentucky University from 2005 to 2009.  He was a member of the 2008 Sweet Sixteen team which included Courtney Lee, Tyrone Brazelton, Ty Rogers, and Boris Siakam.  In 2009, he was named the Sun Belt Conference Men's Basketball Player of the Year, and the Sun Belt Conference Male Athlete of the Year.  In addition, he received All-American accolades, and recorded the first-ever triple double in Western Kentucky history.

Professional career
After failing to be drafted in the 2009 NBA Draft, he played professional basketball in the LNBP from 2009 to 2016. On September 14, 2016, Mendez-Valdez signed with the Israeli team Maccabi Haifa for the 2016–17 season. During his season with the club, Mendez-Valdez won the Three-Point Shootout contest in the Israeli League All-Star event, he also helped Haifa reaching the Israeli League Finals.

He returned to the LNBP on August 25, 2017, signing with Soles de Mexicali for the 2017–18 season.

Capitanes de Ciudad de México (2022–present)
On November 4, 2022, Méndez was named to the opening night roster for the Capitanes de Ciudad de México. On January 7, 2023, Méndez-Valdez was waived. On January 19, 2023, Méndez-Valdez was reacquired by the Capitanes de Ciudad de México.

National team career
In 2013, Mendez-Valdez helped lead Mexico to victory in the gold medal game against Puerto Rico at the FIBA Americas Championship.

Honours
Pan American Games 2011 Silver Medal 
FIBA COCABA Championship 2013 Gold Medal 
FIBA Americas Championship 2013 Gold Medal 
Centrobasket 2016  Silver Medal

References

External links
 RealGM profile

1986 births
Living people
2014 FIBA Basketball World Cup players
American emigrants to Mexico
American expatriate basketball people in Israel
American sportspeople of Mexican descent
American men's basketball players
Basketball players at the 2011 Pan American Games
Basketball players at the 2015 Pan American Games
Basketball players from San Antonio
Capitanes de Ciudad de México players
Gansos Salvajes UIC players
Halcones de Xalapa players
Maccabi Haifa B.C. players
Medalists at the 2011 Pan American Games
Mexican expatriate sportspeople in Israel
Mexican men's basketball players
Pan American Games medalists in basketball
Pan American Games silver medalists for Mexico
Pioneros de Quintana Roo players
Point guards
Shooting guards
Soles de Mexicali players
Western Kentucky Hilltoppers basketball players